The Höllentalspitzen are three peaks in the Wetterstein Mountains near Garmisch-Partenkirchen in southern Germany. They rise from the ridge of Blassenkamm which runs eastwards from Germany's highest peak, the Zugspitze, and separate the Hölle Valley to the north from the Reintal Valley to the south.

Ascent 
The summits can only be climbed by experienced mountaineers. As a rule they are tackled by negotiating the ridge of the Jubiläumsgrat ("Jubilee Arête"). The Jubigrat, as it is known in mountaineering circles is the climbing route from the Zugspitze over the Höllentalspitzen and the Vollkarspitze to the Grießkarscharte and on to the Alpspitze, and requires firm mastery of the third grade of difficulty on the UIAA scale. This long crossing can only be interrupted by the equally difficult Brunntalgrat ridge, which branches off to the south near the summit of the Inner Höllentalspitze, and descends to the Knorr Hut in the Reintal Valley. Between the Middle and Outer Höllentalspitze is the mountain hut known as the Höllentalgrat Hut, a small, unmanaged bothy for emergencies.

Gallery

References 

Mountains of the Alps
Mountains of Bavaria
Wetterstein
Two-thousanders of Germany